Charles Frederick "Chook" Zinnick (31 March 1896 – 5 August 1967) was an Australian rules footballer who played with Essendon and Footscray.

Family
The son of Anton August Zinnack (1856-1915), and Elizabeth Zinnack (1862-1912), née Dewson, Carl Frederick Zinnack was born at Birkenhead, South Australia on 31 March 1896.

Football

Yarraville (VJFA)
1914, 1919, 1922,

Essendon (VFL)
1921. After a short career of 13 games at Essendon, Zinnick moved to Footscray where he played while the club was in the Victorian Football Association.

Footscray (VFA)
1922-1924

Footscray (VFL)
He played only one further VFL game before retiring shortly after Footscray joined the Victorian Football League in 1925.

Death
He died at the Footscray Hospital, in Footscray, Victoria on 5 August 1967.

Notes

References
 Holmesby, Russell & Main, Jim (2007). The Encyclopedia of AFL Footballers. 7th ed. Melbourne: Bas Publishing.
 Maplestone, M., Flying Higher: History of the Essendon Football Club 1872–1996, Essendon Football Club, (Melbourne), 1996.

External links
 
 
 Charles "Chooka" Zinnick, at The VFA Project.

1896 births
1967 deaths
Australian rules footballers from Victoria (Australia)
Footscray Football Club (VFA) players
Western Bulldogs players
Essendon Football Club players
Yarraville Football Club players